Alfred William Pollard, FBA (14 August 1859 – 8 March 1944) was an English bibliographer, widely credited for bringing a higher level of scholarly rigor to the study of Shakespearean texts.

Biography
Pollard was born at 1 Brompton Square, Kensington in London, the youngest son of a doctor, Edward William Pollard. He was educated at King's College School in the Strand and St John's College at the University of Oxford. Unable to teach due to his pronounced stammer, he joined the staff of the British Museum in 1883, as assistant in the department of printed books; he was promoted to assistant keeper in 1909, and keeper in 1919. In the latter year, Pollard was appointed professor of English bibliography at the University of London. He was honorary secretary of the Bibliographical Society from 1893 to 1934 and edited the society's journal The Library for thirty years (1903–34). He received the society's gold medal in 1929.

Pollard married Alice England of Newnham College in 1887 and there were two sons and a daughter. But during the war his two sons were both lost in action: his oldest, Geoffrey Blemell Pollard, a Lieutenant in the Royal Field Artillery was killed in the fighting near Le Baseé, France on 24 October 1914. Then a year later, on 13 October 1915, his second son Roger Thompson Pollard, a Lieutenant in the 5th Royal Berkshire Regiment, was also killed. Pollard wrote a memorial, Two Brothers. Accounts Rendered, which was privately printed for friends in 1916, and a year later issued by Sidgwick and Jackson.

Pollard wrote widely on a range of subjects in English literature throughout his career, and collaborated with various scholars in specialized studies; he edited Sir Philip Sidney's Astrophel in 1888, Chaucer's Canterbury Tales (Globe edition, 1898), a collection of Fifteenth Century Poetry and Prose (1903) and Thomas Malory's Le Morte d'Arthur (1910–11, in four volumes). His Shakespeare Folios and Quartos: a Study in the Bibliography of Shakespeare's Plays, 1594–1685, published in 1909, remains an important milestone in Shakespearian criticism.

With Gilbert Richard Redgrave, he edited the STC, or A short-title catalogue of books printed in England, Scotland, & Ireland and of English books printed abroad, 1475–1640 (1926). He provided a bibliographical introduction to a facsimile print of the 1611 King James Bible which was produced for its three hundredth anniversary. His contemporary friends included the poet A. E. Housman and the artist Walter Sickert, and he was a close colleague of the prominent Shakespeare scholars Edmund Kerchever Chambers and R. B. McKerrow.

In 1935 Pollard suffered a fall while gardening which seriously affected him, but he lived another nine years, dying at Wimbledon Hospital, aged 85, survived by his daughter. He is buried with his wife Alice (1857-1925) in the churchyard of St Mary's Church, Wimbledon.

Works

Last words on the history of the title-page, with notes on some colophons and twenty-seven fac-similes of title-pages, 1891.
 Chaucer, London, Macmillan and Co, 1893.
English Miracle Plays, Moralities and Interludes; Specimens of the Pre-Elizabethan Drama, Oxford, the Clarendon Press, 1898 (third revised edition).
 fourth revised edition, 1904.
 (ed.) Fifteenth Century Poetry and Prose, London, 1903.
 Books in the House:  An Essay on Private Libraries and Collections for Young and Old, Indianapolis: By Arrangement with Ralph Fletcher Seymour by Bobbs-Merrill, 1904.
An Essay on Colophons, 1905.
Shakespeare Folios and Quartos: A Study in the Bibliography of Shakespeare's Plays, 1909.
 (ed. with an introduction by Pollard) Records of the English Bible: The Documents Relating to the Translation and Publication of the Bible in English, 1525–1611, London, Oxford University Press, 1911.
 Fine Books, 1912.
A New Shakespeare Quarto: Richard II, 1916.
 Tales of King Arthur and the Knights of the Round Table, abridged from Le Morte d'Arthur, 1917.
Shakespeare's Fight with the Pirates and the Problems of the Transmission of His Text, 1917.
 Two Brothers. Accounts Rendered, London, 1917.
The Foundations of Shakespeare's Text, 1923. Annual Shakespeare Lecture of the British Academy.
Shakespeare's Hand in the Play of Sir Thomas More (with W. W. Greg, Edward Maunde Thompson, John Dover Wilson and R. W. Chambers), 1923.
Early Illustrated Books: A History of the Decoration and Illustration of Books in the 15th and 16th Centuries, 1927.
The Trained Printer and the Amateur, and the Pleasure of Small Books, 1929.
A Census of Shakespeare's Plays in Quarto (with Henrietta C. Bartlett), 1939.

References

Woudhuysen, Henry R. A.E.H., A.W.P.: A Classical Friendship. Tunbridge Wells, Kent, Foundling Press and Bernard Quaritch, 2006.
Murphy, Gwendoen, and Henry Thomas. A Select Bibliography of the Writings of Alfred W. Pollard. Oxford, Oxford University Press, 1938.
New General Catalog of Old Books and Authors

External links

 
 
 
 Portrait by Frank Brooks at the British Library

Employees of the British Library
Alumni of St John's College, Oxford
Academics of the University of London
1859 births
1944 deaths
Shakespearean scholars
English bibliographers